Schendel Lake is a lake in Hennepin County, in the U.S. state of Minnesota.

Schendel Lake was named for a German settler.

See also
List of lakes in Minnesota

References

Lakes of Minnesota
Lakes of Hennepin County, Minnesota